The 2023 Bolton Metropolitan Borough Council elections are scheduled to take place on 4 May 2023 alongside other local elections across the United Kingdom. Due to boundary changes, all 60 seats on Bolton Metropolitan Borough Council will be up for election.

Background 
The Local Government Act 1972 created a two-tier system of metropolitan counties and districts covering Greater Manchester, Merseyside, South Yorkshire, Tyne and Wear, the West Midlands, and West Yorkshire starting in 1974. Bolton was a district of the Greater Manchester metropolitan county. The Local Government Act 1985 abolished the metropolitan counties, with metropolitan districts taking on most of their powers as metropolitan boroughs. The Greater Manchester Combined Authority was created in 2011 and began electing the mayor of Greater Manchester from 2017, which was given strategic powers covering a region coterminous with the former Greater Manchester metropolitan county.

In December 2022 the Local Government Boundary Commission for England made The Bolton (Electoral Changes) Order 2022, which officially abolished all 20 existing wards and established 20 new wards with new boundaries. Because of this change all 60 seats on the council, three per ward, are being contested.

Electoral process 
The election will take place using the plurality block voting system, a form of first-past-the-post voting, with each wards being represented by three councillors. The candidate with the most votes in each ward will serve a four year term ending in 2027, the second-placed candidate will serve a three year term ending in 2026 and the third-placed candidate will serve a one year term ending in 2024.

All registered electors (British, Irish, Commonwealth and European Union citizens) living in Bolton aged 18 or over will be entitled to vote in the election. People who live at two addresses in different councils, such as university students with different term-time and holiday addresses, are entitled to be registered for and vote in elections in both local authorities. Voting in-person at polling stations will take place from 07:00 to 22:00 on election day, and voters will be able to apply for postal votes or proxy votes in advance of the election.

Candidates 

Asterisks denote incumbent councillors seeking re-election.

Astley Bridge

Bradshaw

Breightmet

Bromley Cross

Farnworth North

Farnworth South

Great Lever

Halliwell

Heaton, Lostock and Chew Moor

Horwich North

Horwich South and Blackrod

Hulton

Kearsley

Little Lever and Darcy Lever

Queens Park and Central

Rumworth

Smithills

Tonge with the Haulgh

Westhoughton North and Hunger Hill

Westhoughton South

References 

Bolton
Bolton Metropolitan Borough Council elections